Events from the year 1954 in Romania. The year was marked by the 1954 Romanian blizzard.

Incumbents 

 President of the Provisional Presidium of the Republic: Petru Groza.
 Prime Minister: Gheorghe Gheorghiu-Dej.
 General Secretary of the Romanian Communist Party:
 Gheorghe Gheorghiu-Dej (until 19 April).
 Gheorghe Apostol (from 19 April).

Events 

 9 January – Opera Națională București (Bucharest National Opera) perform for the first time at their new venue. The performance is Tchaikovsky's The Queen of Spades.
 31 March – Jewish writer A. L. Zissu is sentenced to life imprisonment for "conspiring against the social order".
 17 April – Article 4 of Decree nr. 189 establishes ensigns for auxiliary and Coast Guard vessels as well as serving ships of the Romanian Navy.
 15 May – The Latin Union is created with Romania a founder member.
 18 September – TARS is renamed TAROM (Transporturi Aeriene Române, Romanian Air Transport) to recognise the full ownership of the airline by the Romanian state.
 5 December – Metalul Reșița become the first club representing Divizia B to win the Romanian Cup final.
 Unknown date – The Institute for Film and the Institute for Theatre I. L. Caragiale merge to form the I.L. Caragiale Institute of Theatre and Film Arts (IATC).

Births 

 25 January – Ecaterina Oancia, rowing cox, gold medal winner at the 1984 Summer Olympics.
 16 February – Maria Ștefan, sprint canoer, gold medal winner at the 1984 Summer Olympics.
 10 May – Amos Guttman, Romanian-born director of the first ever Israeli LGBT-themed film (died 1993).
 19 June – Dan Goldstein, software entrepreneur and businessman in Israel (died 2022).
 28 June – Adrian Ioviță, mathematician.
 25 August – Miron Cozma, labor-union organizer, politician, and leader of the Jiu Valley coal miners' union. 
 26 October – Victor Ciorbea, Prime Minister between 12 December 1996 and 30 March 1998.
 7 November – Maria Grapini, politician and engineer.

Deaths 
 3 January – Elena Farago, poet and children's author (born 1878).
 7 January – Alexandru Cisar, Archbishop of the Roman Catholic Archdiocese of Bucharest (born 1880).
 17 April – Execution of political prisoners:
 Lucrețiu Pătrășcanu, politician, lawyer, sociologist and economist (born 1900).
 Remus Koffler, communist activist (born 1902).
 16 May – Vladimir Ghika, Roman Catholic priest, died at Jilava Prison, beatified as a martyr in 2013 (born 1873).
 15 August – Alexandru Toma, poet, journalist and translator (born 1875).
 December 17 – Eugen Țurcanu, criminal who was executed at Jilava Prison for his role in the re-education experiment at Pitești Prison (born 1925).
 December 25 – Ioan Arbore, major general during World War II, died at Văcărești Prison (born 1892).

References 

Years of the 20th century in Romania
1950s in Romania
1954 in Romania
Romania
Romania